Charleston is a ghost town in York County, Nebraska, United States.

History
Charleston (also spelled Charlestown) was platted in 1887. Charles A. McCloud, for whom the community was named, was instrumental in bringing in the railroad to the area.

A post office was established in Charleston in 1888, and remained in operation until it was discontinued in 1941.

References

Ghost towns in Nebraska
Geography of York County, Nebraska